The Golden Coach is a 1952 film directed by Jean Renoir that tells the story of a commedia dell'arte troupe in 18th-century Peru. The screenplay was written by Renoir, Jack Kirkland, Renzo Avanzo and Giulio Macchi, and is based on the 1829 play Le Carrosse du Saint-Sacrement (The Coach of the Blessed Sacrament), by Prosper Mérimée. It stars Anna Magnani, Odoardo Spadaro and Duncan Lamont.

Plot
The Viceroy of a remote 18th-century Peruvian town has purchased a magnificent golden coach from Europe. The Viceroy hints of his intention to give the coach to his mistress, the Marquise, but has decided to pay for it with public funds, since he plans to use it to overawe the populace and flatter the local nobility, who enthusiastically look forward to taking turns parading in it. By coincidence, the coach arrives on the same ship that carries an Italian commedia dell'arte troupe composed of men, women and children who perform as singers, actors, acrobats and comics. The troupe is led by Don Antonio, who also portrays the stock character of Pantalone on stage, and features Camilla, who plays the stock role of Columbina.

Once members of the troupe refurbish the town's dilapidated theater, their performances meet with success only after local hero, Ramon, a toreador, becomes smitten with Camilla and starts leading the applause. Similarly, after a command performance at the Viceroy's palace, the gentry withhold their favor until the Viceroy signals his approval and asks to meet the women of the company. He, too, is taken with Camilla, who is the only person who makes him feel comfortable and light-hearted. He gives her a splendid necklace, which enrages her jealous suitor, Felipe, who has been accompanying the troupe on their travels. Felipe attacks Camilla and causes a riotous backstage brawl, after which he runs off to join the army.

The Viceroy has become infatuated with Camilla and announces that he has decided to pay for the coach with his own money, in order to give it to her as a love gift. This outrages the Marquise along with the rest of the nobility, who are already smarting over the Viceroy's demands for money to finance military defenses against an insurgency. Led by the Duc de Castro, they threaten to strip the Viceroy of his post, an action that can only succeed if endorsed by the country's Bishop. When the Viceroy vacillates in the face of this intimidation, Camilla spurns him in disgust.

After watching a triumphant performance by Ramon in the bullring, Camilla impetuously gives him her necklace, which emboldens him to visit her lodging that night and propose that they become a celebrity couple in order to enhance their earning power as performers. There he encounters Felipe, who has returned from extended army service in order to reclaim Camilla and take her away with him to live a simple life among the natives. While the two men fight each other with swords, the Viceroy arrives to tell Camilla that he has defied the nobility and is giving her the coach, which she can claim from him immediately. Upon questioning, he admits to her that he expects the Bishop, who arrives on the morrow, to approve the nobles' plan to depose him. Felipe and Ramon are arrested for dueling in public.

All is resolved the next morning when Camilla gives the coach to the Bishop as a gesture of piety. The Bishop announces his plan to use the coach to transport the sacraments to sick and dying peasants and calls for peace and reconciliation among all the disputing parties. As the curtain falls, Don Antonio reminds Camilla that, as an actress, she is only able to realize her true self when she is performing on the stage.

Cast

Anna Magnani as Camilla
Odoardo Spadaro as Don Antonio
Nada Fiorelli as Isabella
Dante (Harry August Jensen) as Arlequin
Duncan Lamont as Ferdinand, The Viceroy
George Higgins as Martinez
Ralph Truman as Duc de Castro
Gisella Mathews as Marquise Irene Altamirano
Raf De La Torre as The Chief Justice
Elena Altieri as Duchesse de Castro
Paul Campbell as Felipe
Riccardo Rioli as Ramon, the Toreador
William Tubbs as Aubergiste, the Innkeeper
Jean Debucourt as The Bishop

Production
The film was shot at Cinecittà in Rome, with cinematography by Claude Renoir and music by Antonio Vivaldi. A French-Italian co-production, it was filmed in English. A shoot in French was planned as well, but it had to be abandoned due to financial problems. Renoir let his assistant director Marc Maurette direct the dubbing in French. The French version was the first to appear in theaters. An Italian version was also made.

Renoir repeatedly preferred the English version: it was the only one to be restored in 2012. François Truffaut reportedly referred to The Golden Coach as "the noblest and most refined film ever made".

"In its own time, The Golden Coach was an international failure in all three language versions with both the critics and the public." "Seen today by the international community of cinephiles as a truly 'beauteous' and 'ravishing' comic fantasy from Jean Renoir's late period, The Golden Coach can best be appreciated as an illustrious filmmaker's elegant tribute to the theater. The 'comedy'... is based... on a clear-eyed vision of art's denial of 'normal' life. Instead of seeking the nonexistent 'psychology' of the characters, one must follow the flowing images as a mobile painting driven by Magnani and Vivaldi across the canvas of an Italianate spectacle. Eric Rohmer has described The Golden Coach as 'the open sesame' of all Renoir's work. The two customary poles of his work—art and nature, acting and life—take shape in two facing mirrors, which reflect each other's images back and forth until it is impossible to tell where one ends and the other begins."

References

External links

The Golden Coach an essay by Andrew Sarris at the Criterion Collection

1952 films
1950s French-language films
1950s adventure comedy films
Films based on works by Prosper Mérimée
Films directed by Jean Renoir
Films set in the 18th century
Films set in Peru
English-language French films
English-language Italian films
French films based on plays
1952 comedy films
1950s English-language films